Dirty Workz is a Belgian hardstyle, jumpstyle and happy hard record label founded in 2006  by Koen Bauweraerts, also known as DJ Coone. Dirty Workz is home to many famous hardstyle acts, including Da Tweekaz, and Wasted Penguinz. Dirty Workz also releases many jumpstyle releases from artists like Fenix, Dr. Rude, & Demoniak. Dirty Workz is a sublabel of Toff Music, a larger Belgian label. Toff Music releases all the albums from the Dirty Workz artists, while Dirty Workz itself focuses on digital and 12 inch releases. Dirty Workz is the main label and contains different sublabels: ANARCHY, DWX Bounce and DWX Update. In 2016 a new sublabel was announced within Dirtyworkz known as Wolf Clan. In 2018 the happy hard sublabel Electric Fox was announced. 

In October 2012, the label announced the arrival of Deepack and his new EP entitled Anarchy.  In July 2013, Coone collaborated with American Steve Aoki's Dim Mak Records label, in order to further popularize his label internationally. In June 2014, Dirty Workz announced that they had signed a new notorious band from the hardstyle scene, Wasted Penguinz. In early September, it was Dr. Rude's turn to join the label.

Artists 
 Dirty Workz 
 Amentis
 Bassbrain
 Coone
 Crystal Lake
 Cyber
 Da Tweekaz
 Denza
 Dillytek
 Dr Phunk
 Dr Rude
 Ecstatic
 Firelite
 Hard Driver
 Jay Reeve
 Jesse Jax
 JNXD
 Kane Scott
 Mandy
 Pherato
 Phrantic
 Primeshock
 Psyko Punkz
 Public Enemies (Hard Driver & Digital Punk)
 Refuzion
 Sickddellz
 Solstice
 Sub Sonik
 Sub Zero Project
 Sylence
 The Elite (Alias of Coone, Hard Driver, Da Tweekaz)
 TNT (Technoboy 'N' Tuneboy)
 Wasted Penguinz 
 WDM
 Zatox

 DWX Update 
 Aria
 Blasco
 Forever Lost
 Heatwavez
 Horyzon
 Serzo
 Strixter
 Synthsoldier
Yuta Imai

 Wolf Clan 
 Rize
 Talon
 Teknoclash

 Audiophetamine 
 Audiofreq

 Electric Fox 
 Darren Styles
Jakka-B
 Mike Enemy
 Mike Reverie
Tatsunoshin (JP page)
 Technikore
 Tweekacore (Alias of Da Tweekaz)
 Quickdrop

References

External links
 Dirty Workz on Discogs
 Dirty Workz on Facebook
 Dirty Workz on Twitter
 Dirty Workz on Youtube

Belgian record labels